The women's pole vault at the 2019 World Athletics Championships was held at the Khalifa International Stadium in Doha, Qatar, from 27 to 29 September 2019.

Summary
During qualifications, 17 women made it to the final by clearing 4.60 m.  In the final, they started at 4.50 m but jumped next to 4.70 m, taking the field down to a dozen, nine still with clean rounds.  At 4.80 m, six were over, but only Anzhelika Sidorova and Sandi Morris were still clean.  At 4.85 m, defending and Olympic champion Katerina Stefanidi missed once, while Morris and Sidorova remained clean.  Angelica Bengtsson, Alysha Newman, and Holly Bradshaw could not get over the bar.  Bradshaw saved one attempt for 4.90 m but missed, and then Stefanidi missed.  When Morris and Sidorova cleared on their first attempts, Stefanidi saved her two remaining attempts for 4.95 m.  At this height, only three women had ever cleared , one of them Morris who had done it four times.  Through the first two rounds of attempts, nobody cleared, eliminating Stefanidi with the bronze.  On her final attempt, Morris missed.  Then, Sidorova cleared.  The tie was broken, and Sidorova became only the fourth woman in history to clear 4.95 m.

Morris congratulated her opponent after the winning vault, an act which earned her a place on the shortlist for the International Fair Play Award that year.

The final is noted as one of the best finals in the history of the World Championships. Six women cleared 4.80 m, a record for the event. Prior to 2019, the maximum number of women who cleared 4.80 m in a World Championship final was three, in 2013 and 2015. In fact, the winning height of 4.95 m would have won all previous World Championships except for 2005 when Yelena Isinbayeva won with a then-world record of 5.01 m.

Records
Before the competition records were as follows:

Schedule
The event schedule, in local time (UTC+3), was as follows:

Results

Qualification
Qualification: 4.60 m (Q) or at least 12 best performers (q).

Final
The final was started on 29 September at 20:01.

References

Pole vault
Pole vault at the World Athletics Championships